The 1975–76 Eredivisie season was the 16th season of the Eredivisie, the top level of ice hockey in the Netherlands. Eight teams participated in the league, and the Tilburg Trappers won the championship.

Regular season
 
 (* The Heerenveen Flyers had two points deducted)

External links
Nederlandse IJshockey Bond

Neth
Eredivisie (ice hockey) seasons